Forte de São Mateus do Cabo Frio is a fort located Cabo Frio, Rio de Janeiro in Brazil.

See also
Military history of Brazil

References

External links

Sao Mateus
Buildings and structures in Rio de Janeiro (state)
Portuguese colonial architecture in Brazil